The 2021–22 CSA Women's Provincial T20 Competition was the 9th edition of South Africa's provincial Twenty20 cricket tournament. The tournament began in January 2022 and ended on 27 March 2022, with 16 teams competing in three divisions. Western Province won the tournament, their seventh T20 title.

Competition format
The 16 teams were divided into three divisions: a top division named "Top 6", and two lower divisions, Pools A and B. Teams played each other team in their group once in a round-robin format, with matches played using a Twenty20 format. The winner of the Top 6 group was crowned Champions.

The tournament ran concurrently with the 2021–22 CSA Women's Provincial Programme, with matches played either the day before or day after the corresponding encounter between two teams in the one-day tournament. To maintain this link for the following season, promotion and relegation in the Provincial T20 Competition is determined by standings in the Provincial League.

The groups worked on a points system with positions being based on the total points. Points were awarded as follows:

Win: 4 points. 
Tie: 3 points. 
Loss: 0 points.
Abandoned/No Result: 2 points.
Bonus Point: 1 bonus point available per match.

Teams

Tables

Top 6

Pool A

Pool B

References

CSA Women's Provincial T20 Competition
Domestic cricket competitions in 2021–22
2021–22 South African cricket season
2022 in South African women's sport